Chanzanaq (also Romanized as Chanz̄ānaq) is a village in Sharqi Rural District, in the Central District of Ardabil County, Ardabil Province, Iran. At the 2006 census, its population was 728, in 144 families.

References 

Towns and villages in Ardabil County